Carlow-Kilkenny Acute Hospitals was a hospital network in County Kilkenny, Ireland.  It consisted of:
 Kilcreene Orthopaedic Hospital
 St. Luke's General Hospital

Both hospitals are now part of a revised hospital group structure, with Kilcreene Orthopaedic Hospital moving to the South-South West Hospital Group, and St. Luke's General Hospital moving to the Ireland East Hospital Group.

References

See also
List of hospitals in Ireland

County Kilkenny
Hospital networks